David McPherson Broome  (born 1 March 1940) is a retired Welsh show jumping champion. He competed in the 1960, 1964, 1968, 1972 and 1988 Olympics and won individual bronze medals in 1960 on Sunsalve and in 1968 on his best-known horse Mr Softee. In 1960, he was also voted BBC Sports Personality of the Year, and at the 1972 Games served as the Olympic flag bearer for Great Britain.

Broome was born in Cardiff, attended Monmouth School, and still maintains his stables at Mount Ballan Manor, Crick, near Chepstow in Monmouthshire.  He held the individual European title in 1961, 1967 and 1969. In 1970, he won the world title and became Western Mail Welsh Sports Personality of the year. He turned professional in 1973, and in 1978 helped the British team to win the world championship. Broome has won the King George V Gold Cup a record six times on six different horses between 1960–1991, a record yet to be equalled. He has enjoyed most of his success on Irish Sport Horses and he has said his favourite horse of all was Sportsman. Broome's sister, Liz Edgar, was also a top-class showjumper.

Broome is still active in the administration of the sport. In 2013, he became president of the British Showjumping Association.

Broome was appointed an Officer of the Order of the British Empire (OBE) in the 1970 Birthday Honours, and promoted to Commander of the same order (CBE) in the 1995 Birthday Honours, on both occasions for services to showjumping.

Major achievements 

Olympic Games
1960 Rome: Individual Bronze medal on Sunsalve
1968 Mexico: Individual Bronze medal on Mister Softee
1988 Seoul: Equal 4th place on Countryman
World championships
1960 Venice: Individual Bronze medal on Sunsalve
1970 La Baule: Individual Gold medal on Beethoven
1978 Aachen: Team Gold medal on Philco
1982 Dublin: Team Bronze medal on Mr Ross
1990 Stockholm: Team Bronze medal on Lannegan
European championships
1961 Aachen: Individual Gold medal on Sunsalve
1967 Rotterdam: Individual Gold medal on Mister Softee
1969 Hickstead: Individual Gold medal on Mister Softee
1977 Vienna: Team Silver medal on Philco
1979 Rotterdam: Team Gold medal on Queensway Big Q
1983 Hickstead: Team Silver medal on Mr Ross
1991 La Baule: Team Silver medal on Lannegan
FEI World Cup
World Cup Jumping League Winner 1979/80 with Queensway Big Q and Sportsman
World Cup qualifier wins
1978/1979 's-Hertogenbosch on Philco
1979/1980 Birmingham on Sportsman
1979/1980 Wien on Philco
1979/1980 Bordeaux on Queensway Big Q
1979/1980 Amsterdam on Sportsman
1980/1981 Olympia (London) on Philco
1981/1982 London (Olympia) on Philco
1981/1982 Dublin on Mr Ross
1983/1984 Amsterdam on Last Resort
 1966 Hickstead Derby winner on Mister Softee
King George V Gold Cup
1960 on Sunsalve
1966 on Mister Softee
1972 on Sportsman
1977 on Philco
1981 on Mr Ross
1991 on Lannegan
International Grand Prix wins include:
1960 Dublin on Sunsalve
1967 Dublin on Mr Softee
1968 Dublin on Mr Softee
1970 La Baule on Beethoven
1973 St.Gallen on Manhattan
1975 Olympia (London) on Philco
1977 Dublin on Philco
1979 Amsterdam on Sportsman
1979 Dublin on Sportsman
1981 Olympia (London) on Philco
1980 Olympia (London) on Philco
1983 Amsterdam on Last Resort
1981 Dublin on Queensway Big Q
1981 Spruce Meadows on Queensway Philco
1981 Horse of the Year Show (Wembley Arena) on Mr Ross

References

External links

CSIO Dublin Grand Prix records 1934 – 2006 pdf.
Amsterdam Grand Prix records 1958 – 2007
 www.sportsrecords.co.uk – King George V Gold Cup records 1960 – 2007
Olympia Horse Show – history
Philco wins 1980 Olympia Grand Prix
Olympia results
David Broome Event Centre

1940 births
Living people
Cricketers from Monmouthshire
Sportspeople from Cardiff
British show jumping riders
Welsh equestrians
Olympic equestrians of Great Britain
British male equestrians
Equestrians at the 1960 Summer Olympics
Equestrians at the 1964 Summer Olympics
Equestrians at the 1968 Summer Olympics
Equestrians at the 1972 Summer Olympics
Equestrians at the 1988 Summer Olympics
Olympic bronze medallists for Great Britain
Welsh Olympic medallists
Commanders of the Order of the British Empire
BBC Sports Personality of the Year winners
People educated at Monmouth School for Boys
Olympic medalists in equestrian
Medalists at the 1968 Summer Olympics
Medalists at the 1960 Summer Olympics